James Ruthven Kemp (1833 – 28 August 1873) was a Scottish-born Australian politician.

A businessman, he migrated to Australia around 1860. In 1864 he was elected to the New South Wales Legislative Assembly for Bathurst, but he resigned in 1866. Kemp died in Sydney in 1873.

References

 

1833 births
1873 deaths
Members of the New South Wales Legislative Assembly
19th-century Australian politicians